Joseph Ferdinand Gould (12 September 188918 August 1957) was an American eccentric, also known as Professor Seagull. Often homeless, he claimed to be the author of the longest book ever written, An Oral History of the Contemporary World, also known as An Oral History of Our Time or Meo Tempore. He inspired the book Joe Gould's Secret (1965) by Joseph Mitchell, and its film adaptation (2000), and is a character in the 2009 computer game The Blackwell Convergence.

Biography
Gould was born in a small suburb outside Boston in 1889. Jill Lepore speculated that he had hypergraphia. In his room at his parents’ house, in Norwood, Massachusetts, Gould had written all over the walls and all over the floor. He exhibited what can today be understood as symptoms of autism and did poorly in school. He attended Harvard University because his family wanted him to become a physician; both his grandfather, who taught at Harvard Medical School, and his father, also a medical doctor, had gone to Harvard. During his senior year, he exhibited strong symptoms of mental illness and was kicked out.

Two months after his departure from Harvard, he embarked on a five-hundred-mile walking trip to Canada, exploring its landscape, and then came back to Boston. He applied for readmission to Harvard and was rejected. In 1915, he did field work for the Eugenics Record Office in Spring Harbor. He then went to North Dakota to study the Ojibwe and Mandan cultures. He gained respect for their cultures, and he also learned how to ride horses, dance, and sing. Gould wrote again to Harvard, asking to be allowed to make up his outstanding credits by taking the examination in a class taught by the anthropologist Earnest Hooton. Gould passed, got his degree, and in 1916 moved to New York. At some point he entered Manhattan State Hospital for the Insane, although he never acknowledged having been institutionalized.

After his release, Malcolm Cowley hired him as a regular reviewer for The New Republic, and Gould became known to local modernist artists and writers. In 1942, Horace Gregory told Joseph Mitchell that in 1930, after an "old maid" had Gould arrested for sexually assaulting her, he and Edmund Wilson signed statements attesting to Gould’s sanity in order to keep him out of an asylum. E. E. Cummings also testified, and Gould was released. As his illness worsened, he lost his reviewing job. His artistic friends wrote stories and harangued editors about him to try to help him, but Gould's condition worsened, and he went in and out of psychiatric hospitals for many years. Jill Lepore speculated that he may have undergone a lobotomy in 1949.

Gould collapsed on the street in 1952, eventually ending up in Pilgrim State Hospital on Long Island, where he died in 1957, aged 68. Time ran an obituary for him: "Gould had no known relatives but many friends, including poet E. E. Cummings, artist Don Freeman, Writers Malcolm Cowley and William Saroyan." None attended his funeral.

An Oral History of Our Time
In 1917, Gould worked as a reporter for the New York Evening Mail. During his time at the newspaper, he had his epiphany for the longest book ever written. He would title this book An Oral History of Our Time. The book was supposedly based on a word-for-word account of people's lives, which Gould had listened to. Gould talked about the manuscript frequently, and Mitchell in 1942 suggested that "it may well be the lengthiest unpublished work in existence." Edward J. O’Brien, the editor of Best American Short Stories and a Harvard classmate of Gould's, testified that, "Mr. Ezra Pound and I once saw a fragment of it running to perhaps 40,000 words," and deemed it to have "considerable psychological and historical importance." Pound said: "Mr. Joe Gould’s prose style is uneven." "My history is uneven," Gould admitted. "It should be. It is an encyclopedia."

In the October, 1923 issue of Broom: An International Magazine of the Arts, Malcolm Cowley and Slater Brown covered Joe Gould.  The issue contained the "Portrait of Joe Gould" illustration by Joseph Stella, the biographical sketch "Joseph Gould: The Man" by Edward Nagle and Slater Brown, and Gould's own "Social Position (Chapter CCCLXVIII of Joseph Gould's History of the Contemporary World, to be published posthumously.)".

The poet Marianne Moore, as editor of The Dial, published in the April, 1929 issue, under the heading "From Joe Gould's Oral History", the two chapters "Marriage" and "Civilization". She solicited further work from Gould before The Dial folded in 1929.

In 1964 Mitchell published the second of two profiles of Gould for The New Yorker, later collected in the 1965 book Joe Gould's Secret. Mitchell asserted that the Oral History never existed. Upon the publication of Mitchell's "Joe Gould’s Secret," in September, 1964, people began to write to him and send him notebook copies of the Oral History. "I wish I had had this information when I wrote the second Profile," Mitchell told people who wrote to him, "and if I ever write another article about Joe Gould, which I may do, I’d like very much to have a talk with you." In the July 27, 2015 issue of The New Yorker,  and in a 2016 book of the same title, Lepore contradicted Mitchell's claim that Gould's manuscript never existed, having found in Mitchell's papers, which had recently been deposited at the New York Public Library, not only letters from readers who had seen the notebooks but also at least one volume of the "Oral History" itself. Among the readers who wrote to Mitchell in 1964 was the writer Millen Brand, who told him that the "Oral History" had in fact existed, that he had read much of it, and that the longest stretch of it concerned the Black artist Augusta Savage, with whom Gould, Brand reported, had been violently obsessed. Drawing from evidence in Gould's letters, scattered across dozens of archives, and in both the Mitchell Papers and from the Millen Brand papers at Columbia, Lepore suggests that Gould had repeatedly attacked Savage, who told Brand that, as a Black woman, she had been unable to get help from the police. Lepore speculates that Gould's harassment and attacks may have contributed to Savage's decision to leave New York in 1939.

Representations and legacy
One of Gould's pastimes was going to beatnik poetry readings in New York, where he recited absurd poems he made up to mock the serious poetry of other participants. PM news photographer Ray Platnick photographed for a feature on Greenwich Village poets, including Joe Gould along with Diana Barrett Moulton and Maxwell Bodenheim in eccentric poses in front of their verses scrawled on the walls of the Village Arts Center at 1 Charles St. Gould claimed to understand the behavior and language of seagulls, saying that he had translated the works of Henry Wadsworth Longfellow into their language.

William Saroyan wrote a short story about Gould in his 1971 book, Letters from 74 rue Taitbout or Don't Go But If You Must Say Hello To Everybody.

Ian Holm portrayed Gould in the 2000 film Joe Gould's Secret, an adaptation of Mitchell’s book.

Gould is mentioned in several poems by E. E. Cummings.

He was referenced in Blackwell, an adventure game series developed by Wadjet Eye Games, and appeared as a spirit in the third game, The Blackwell Convergence.

He made two brief appearances in And The Hippos Were Boiled in Their Tanks, co-authored by William S. Burroughs and Jack Kerouac, set in 1944, but finally published in 2008.

He is a minor character in Broadway Revival, a 2021 novel by Laura Frankos.

References

Further reading
 Wallechinsky, David, and Irving Wallace, Biography of American Writer Joe Gould Parts 1-3 at Trivia-Library.Com
 
 
 

Harvard University alumni
1889 births
1957 deaths
20th-century American male writers